Dharti is a Sanskrit word meaning Earth. It may also refer to:
 Prithvi or Bhumi, Hindu goddess of Earth.
 Dharti (1970 film)
 Dharti (2011 film)

See also
 Dhatri, the Hindu solar deity